Santa Cruz de las Flores ( "descending eagle") is a town in the municipality of San Martín de Hidalgo in the Mexican state of Jalisco. It is the oldest town in the municipality, sources say it was one of the stopping points of the Aztec tribe before settling in Tenochtitlan, having been revealed the eagle emblem on the hillside area.

The town is most famous for its parroquia, which dates to the mid-16th century. The town serves as the medical, cultural, and federal center for the towns surrounding it. The nearby towns within the territorial sub-committee of Santa Cruz are Jesús María, Río Grande, San Jerónimo, Mesa del Cobre, El Cobre, and Lagunillas. 

Santa Cruz is strategically situated on an oblong hill about a half-mile south of the municipal seat. The town is known for its streets, that runs from west to east following a sloping terrain, which fits perfectly for the panoramic view of the inset valley of Santa Cruz.

Population
According to the INEGI census of 2010; 1,531 inhabitants reside in Santa Cruz de las Flores. 756 of them male, and 775 of them female. There were a total of 432 homes in the locality. 

Populated places in Jalisco
Populated places established in 1540